Steve J. Fenton (born 1951) is an English former professional footballer who played as a full back and midfielder.

Career
Born in Hartlepool, Fenton played for Middlesbrough, Bradford City and Bradford Park Avenue.

For Bradford City he made 10 appearances in the Football League, scoring 1 goal. He also scored 1 goals in 3 appearances in the Football League Cup.

Sources

References

1951 births
Living people
English footballers
Middlesbrough F.C. players
Bradford City A.F.C. players
Bradford (Park Avenue) A.F.C. players
English Football League players
Association football fullbacks
Association football midfielders
Footballers from Hartlepool